Second Empire style, also known as the Napoleon III style, is a highly eclectic style of architecture and decorative arts, which uses elements of many different historical styles, and also made innovative use of modern materials, such as iron frameworks and glass skylights.  It flourished during the reign of Emperor Napoleon III in France (1852–1870) and had an important influence on architecture and decoration in the rest of Europe and North America. Major examples of the style include the Opéra Garnier (1862–1871) in Paris by Charles Garnier, the Bibliothèque nationale de France, the Church of Saint Augustine (1860–1871), and the Philadelphia City Hall (1871–1901). The architectural style was closely connected with Haussmann's renovation of Paris carried out during the Second Empire; the new buildings, such as the Opéra, were intended as the focal points of the new boulevards.

Characteristics

The Napoleon III or Second Empire style took its inspiration from several different periods and styles, which were often combined in the same building or interior.  The interior of the Opéra Garnier by Charles Garnier combined architectural elements of the French Renaissance, Palladian architecture, and French Baroque, and managed to give it coherence and harmony.  The Lions Gate of the Louvre Palace by Hector Lefuel  is a  Louis-Napoléon version of French Renaissance architecture;  few visitors to the Louvre realize it is a 19th-century addition to the building.

Another characteristic of the Napoleon III style is the adaptation of the design of the building to its function and the characteristics of the material used. Examples include the Gare du Nord railway station by Jacques Ignace Hittorff, the Church of Saint Augustin by Victor Baltard, and particularly the iron-framed structures of the market of Les Halles and the reading room of the Bibliothèque nationale in Paris, both also by Victor Baltard.

A basic principle of Napoleon III interior decoration was leave no space undecorated.  Another principle was polychromy, an abundance of color obtained by using colored marble, malachite, onyx, porphyry, mosaics, and silver or gold plated bronze. Wood panelling was often encrusted with rare and exotic woods, or darkened to resemble ebony. The façade of the Opéra Garnier employed seventeen different colored materials, including various marbles, stones, and bronze.

Architecture

Second Empire is an architectural style most popular in the latter half of the 19th century and early years of the 20th century. It was so named for the architectural elements in vogue during the era of the Second French Empire. As the Second Empire style evolved from its 17th-century Renaissance foundations, it acquired a mix of earlier European styles, most notably the Baroque, often combined with mansard roofs and/or low, square-based domes.

The style quickly spread and evolved as Baroque Revival architecture throughout Europe and across the Atlantic. Its suitability for super-scaling allowed it to be widely used in the design of municipal and corporate buildings. In the United States, where one of the leading architects working in the style was Alfred B. Mullett, buildings in the style were often closer to their 17th-century roots than examples of the style found in Europe.

The dominant architectural style of the Second Empire was eclecticism, drawing liberally from the Gothic style, Renaissance style, and the styles dominant during the reigns of Louis XV and Louis XVI. The style was described by Émile Zola, not an admirer of the Empire, as "the opulent bastard child of all the styles".  The best example was the Opéra Garnier,  begun in 1862 but not finished until 1875.  The architect was Charles Garnier (1825–1898), who won the competition for the design when he was only thirty-seven.  When asked by the Empress Eugénie what the style of the building was called, he replied simply, "Napoleon III". At the time, it was the largest opera house in the world, but much of the interior space was devoted to purely decorative spaces: grand stairways, huge foyers for promenading, and large private boxes.  Another example was the Mairie, or city hall, of the 1st arrondissement of Paris, built in 1855–1861 in a neo-Gothic style by the architect Jacques Ignace Hittorff (1792–1867).

The Second Empire also saw the completion or restoration of several architecture treasures: the Nouveau Louvre project realized a longstanding ambition of rationalizing the Louvre Palace, the famed stained glass windows and structure of the Sainte-Chapelle were restored by Eugène Viollet-le-Duc, and the Cathedral of Notre-Dame underwent extensive restoration. In the case of the Louvre in particular, the restorations were sometimes more imaginative than precisely historical.

Religious architecture

During the Second Empire, under the influence particularly of the architect and historian Eugène Viollet-le-Duc,  French religious architecture broke away from the neoclassical style which had dominated Paris church architecture since the 18th century.  Neo-Gothic and other historical styles began to be built, particularly in the eight new arrondissements farther from the center added by Napoleon III in 1860. The first neo-Gothic church was the Basilica of Sainte-Clothilde, begun by Christian Gau in 1841 and finished by Théodore Ballu in 1857.

During the Second Empire, architects began to use metal frames combined with the Gothic style:  the Eglise Saint-Laurent, a 15th-century church rebuilt in neo-Gothic style by Simon-Claude-Constant Dufeux (1862–65), Saint-Eugene-Sainte-Cecile by Louis-Auguste Boileau and Adrien-Louis Lusson (1854–55), and Saint-Jean-Baptiste de Belleville by Jean-Bapiste Lassus (1854–59).  The largest new church built in Paris during the Second Empire was Church of Saint Augustine (1860–71) by Victor Baltard, the designer of the metal pavilions of the market of Les Halles. While the façade was eclectic, the structure inside was modern, supported by slender cast iron columns.

Not all churches under Napoleon III were built in the Gothic style.  Marseille Cathedral, constructed from 1852 to 1896, was designed in a Byzantine Revival style from 1852 to 1896, principally by Léon Vaudoyer and Henri-Jacques Espérandieu.

The Louvre

Napoleon III's many projects included the completion of the Louvre Palace, which adjoined his own residence in the Tuileries Palace. The Nouveau Louvre project was led by architect Hector Lefuel between 1852 and 1857. Between 1864 and 1868, Napoleon III also commissioned Lefuel to rebuild the Pavillon de Flore;  Lefuel added many of his own decorations and ideas to the pavilion, including a celebrated sculpture of Flore by Jean-Baptiste Carpeaux. Lefuel's grands guichets of the Louvre originally featured an equestrian statue of Napoleon III by Antoine-Louis Barye over the central arch, which was removed during the Third Republic.

Interior decoration and furniture

Comfort was the first priority of Second Empire furniture.  Chairs were elaborately upholstered with fringes, tassels, and expensive fabrics.  Tapestry work on furniture was very much in style. The structure of chairs and sofas was usually entirely hidden by the upholstery or ornamented with copper, shell, or other decorative elements.  Novel and exotic new materials, such as bamboo, papier-mâché, and rattan, were used for the first time in European furniture, along with polychrome wood, and wood painted with black lacquer. The upholstered pouffe, or footstool, appeared, along with the angle sofa and unusual chairs for intimate conversations between two persons (Le confident) or three people (Le indiscret). The crapaud (or toad) armchair was low, with a thickly padded back and arms, and a fringe that hid the legs of the chair.

The French Renaissance and the Henry II style were popular influences on chests and cabinets, buffets and credences, which were massive and built like small cathedrals, decorated with columns, frontons, cartouches, mascarons, and carved angels and chimeras.  They were usually constructed of walnut or oak, or sometimes of poirier stained to resemble ebony.

Another popular influence was the Louis XVI style, or French neoclassicism, which was preferred by the Empress Eugénie.  Her rooms at the Tuileries Palace and other Places were decorated in this style.

Urbanism – Haussmann's renovation of Paris

The Napoleon III style is inseparable from renovation of Paris under Georges-Eugène Haussmann, the Emperor's Prefect of the Seine between 1852 and 1870. The buildings of the renovation show a singularity of purpose and design, a consistency of urban planning that was unusual for the period. Numerous public edifices: railway stations, the tribunal de commerce de Paris, and the Palais Garnier were constructed in the style.  The major buildings, including the Opera House and the St. Augustine church, were designed to be the focal points of the new avenues, and to be visible at a great distance.

Napoleon III also built monumental fountains to decorate the heart of the city;  his Paris city architect, Gabriel Davioud, designed the polychrome Fontaine Saint-Michel (officially the Fontaine de la Paix) at the beginning of Haussmann's new Boulevard Saint-Michel.  Davioud's other major Napoleon III works included the two theatres at the Place du Châtelet, as well as the ornamental fence of Parc Monceau and the kiosks and temples of the Bois de Boulogne, Bois de Vincennes, and other Paris parks.

The expansion of the city limits by Napoleon III and Haussmann's new boulevards called for the construction of a variety of new public buildings, including the new tribunal de commerce (1861–67), influenced by the French Renaissance style,  by Théodore Ballu;  and the new city hall of the 1st arrondissement, by Jacques Ignace Hittorff (1855–60), in a combination of Renaissance and Gothic styles.  The new city hall was located next to the Gothic church of Saint-Germain l'Auxerrois.  Between the two structures, the architect Théodore Ballu constructed a Gothic bell tower (1862), to link the two buildings.

New types of architecture connected with the economic expansion: railroad stations, hotels, office buildings, department stores and exposition halls, occupied the center of Paris, which previously had been largely residential. To improve traffic circulation and bring light and air to the center of the city,  Napoleon's Prefect of the Seine destroyed the crumbling and overcrowded neighborhoods in the heart of the city and built a network of grand boulevards. The expanded use of new building materials, especially iron frames, allowed the construction of much larger buildings for commerce and industry.

Architectural restoration

Another aspect of the Napoleon III style was the restoration of historical monuments which had been badly damaged during the French Revolution, or were threatened with destruction by the growth of cities. This program was largely carried out by Eugène Viollet-le-Duc, whose neo-Gothic design for a new Paris Opera later came in second to that of Garnier.  The restoration of Notre-Dame, begun in 1845, continued for twenty-five years. Some of its additions varied from the originals. Viollet-le Duc restored the flèche, or spirelet, of the Cathedral of Notre-Dame de Paris, which had been partially destroyed and desecrated during the French Revolution, in a slightly different style, and added gargoyles which had not originally been present to the façade.

In 1855, he completed the restoration, begun in 1845, of the stained glass windows of the Sainte-Chapelle, and in 1862 he declared it a national historical monument. He also began restoration programs of the medieval walls of the Cité de Carcassonne and other sites. Viollet-le-Duc's restoration was criticized in the late 20th century for sometimes pursuing the spirit of the original work, rather than strict accuracy (for example, by using a type of Gothic tower cap from northern France for the walls of the Cité de Carcassonne, rather than a tower design from that region), but in Carcassonne and other cases the works would have been destroyed entirely without the intervention of Napoleon III and Viollet-le-Duc.

Landscape design

Napoleon III named Georges-Eugène Haussmann his new Prefect of Seine in 1853, and commissioned him to build new parks on the edges of the city, on the model of Hyde Park in London, the parks he had frequented when he was in exile.  Haussmann assembled a remarkable team: Jean-Charles Adolphe Alphand, the city's first Director of the new Service of Promenades and Plantations; Jean-Pierre Barillet-Deschamps, the city's first gardener-in-chief; Eugène Belgrand, a hydraulic engineer who rebuilt the city's sewers and water supply, and provided the water needed for the parks; and Gabriel Davioud, the city's chief architect, who designed chalets, temples, grottos, follies, fences, gates, lodges, lampposts and other park architecture.

Over the course of seventeen years, Napoleon III, Haussmann and Alphand created 1,835 hectares of new parks and gardens, and planted more than six hundred thousand trees, the greatest expansion of Paris green space before or since. They built four major parks in the north, south, east and west of the city, replanted and renovated the historic parks, and added dozens of small squares and gardens, so that no one lived more than ten minutes from a park or square. In addition, they planted tens of thousands of trees along the new boulevards that Haussmann created, reaching out from the center to the outer neighborhoods. The parks of Paris, provided entertainment and relaxation for all classes of Parisians during the Second Empire.

The Napoleon III style of landscape design for urban parks was very influential outside of France. The American landscape designer Frederick Law Olmsted had a map of the Bois de Boulogne on the wall of his office. Central Park in New York City and Golden Gate Park in San Francisco both show the influence of the Napoleon III parks.

Painting – the Paris Salon

Napoleon III's taste in paintings was quite traditional, favoring the academic style cultivated in the Académie des Beaux-Arts. His favorite artists included Alexandre Cabanel, Ernest Meissonier, Jean-Léon Gérôme, and William-Adolphe Bouguereau who received important commissions. Ingres near the end of his life, was also still an important figure in both portrait and history painting.

During the Second Empire, the Paris Salon was the most important event of the year for painters, engravers and sculptors. It was held every two years until 1861, and every year thereafter, in the Palais de l'Industrie, a gigantic exhibit hall built for the Paris Universal Exposition of 1855. The Salon granted medals based around the traditional hierarchy of genres, and a medal from the Salon assured an artist of commissions from wealthy patrons or from the French government. Painters devoted great effort and intrigue to win approval from the jury to present their paintings at the Salon and arrange for good placement in the exhibit halls.

The Paris Salon was directed by the Count Émilien de Nieuwerkerke, the Superintendent of Fine Arts, who was known for his conservative tastes. He was scornful of the new school of Realist painters led by Gustave Courbet. In 1863, the jury of the Paris Salon refused all submissions by avant-garde artists, including those by Édouard Manet, Camille Pissarro and Johan Jongkind. The artists and their friends complained, and the complaints reached Napoleon III. His office issued a statement: "Numerous complaints have come to the Emperor on the subject of the works of art which were refused by the jury of the Exposition. His Majesty, wishing to let the public judge the legitimacy of these complaints, has decided that the works of art which were refused should be displayed in another part of the Palace of Industry."

Following Napoleon's decree, an exhibit of the rejected paintings, called the Salon des Refusés, was held in another part of the Palace of Industry, where the Salon took place. More than a thousand visitors a day came to see now-famous paintings as Édouard Manet's Le Déjeuner sur l'herbe and James McNeill Whistler's Symphony in White, No. 1: The White Girl. The journalist Émile Zola reported that visitors pushed to get into the crowded galleries where the refused paintings were hung, and the rooms were full of the laughter and mocking comments of many of the spectators. While the paintings were ridiculed by many critics and visitors, the work of the avant-garde became known for the first time to the French public, and it took its place alongside the more traditional style of painting.

The government of Napoleon III also commissioned artists to produce decorative works for public buildings. Ingres was commissioned to paint the ceiling of the main salon of the Hotel de Ville of Paris with the Apotheosis of Napoleon, the Emperor's uncle. (The painting was destroyed in 1871 when the building was set afire by the Paris Commune.)  Napoleon III named Ingres a Grand Officer of the Légion d'honneur. In 1862 he was awarded the title of Senator, and made a member of the Imperial Council on Public Instruction.

Delacroix also received important official commissions. From 1857 to 1861 he worked on frescoes for the Chapelle des Anges at the Church of St. Sulpice in Paris. They included "The Battle of Jacob with the Angel", "Saint Michael Slaying the Dragon", and "The Expulsion of Heliodorus from the Temple".

Jean-Baptiste-Camille Corot began his career with study at the École des Beaux-Arts as an academic painter, but gradually began painting more freely and expressing emotions and feelings through his landscapes.  His motto was "never lose that first impression which we feel."   He made sketches in the forests around Paris, then reworked them into final paintings in his studio. He was showing paintings in the Salon as early as 1827, but he did not achieve real fame and critical acclaim before 1855, during the Second Empire.

Birth of a new art movement

While the academic painters dominated the Salon, new artists and new movements rose to prominent prominence under Napoleon III.
Gustave Courbet (1819–1872) was the leader of the school of realist painters during the Second Empire who depicted the lives of ordinary people and rural life, as well as landscapes. He delighted in scandal and condemned the art establishment, the Academy of Fine Arts, and Napoleon III. In 1855, when his submissions to the Salon were rejected, he put on his own exhibit of forty of his paintings in a nearby building. In 1870, Napoleon III proposed giving the Legion of Honour to Courbet, but Courbet disdainfully rejected the offer.

The term Impressionist was not invented until 1874, but during the Second Empire, all the major impressionist painters were at work in Paris, inventing their own personal styles. Claude Monet exhibited two of his paintings, a landscape and portrait of his future wife Camille Doncieux, at the Paris Salon of 1866.

A major decorative painter whose career was launched under Napoleon III was Puvis de Chavannes.  He became known in the Paris in the Belle Époque   for his murals in the Paris Panthéon, the Sorbonne and the Paris Hotel de Ville.

Edgar Degas (1834–1917), the son of a banker, studied academic art at the École des Beaux-Arts and travelled to Italy to study the Renaissance painters. In 1868, he began to frequent the Café Guerbois, where he met Manet, Monet, Renoir and the other artists of a new, more natural school, and began to develop his own style.

Sculpture

The most prominent sculptor of the reign of Napoleon III was Jean-Baptiste Carpeaux, who contributed to the decoration of several Napoleon III landmarks, including the façade of the Opéra Garnier and the new additions to the Louvre. His style perfectly complemented the historical styles, but was original and bold enough to stand on its own.  Born in Valenciennes, Nord, son of a mason, his early studies were under François Rude. Carpeaux entered the École des Beaux-Arts in 1844 and won the Prix de Rome in 1854, and moving to Rome to find inspiration, he there studied the works of Michelangelo, Donatello and Verrocchio. Staying in Rome from 1854 to 1861, he obtained a taste for movement and spontaneity, which he joined with the great principles of baroque art.  Carpeaux sought real life subjects in the streets and broke with the classical tradition.
His sculpture La Danse for the façade of the Paris Opera (1869) caused a scandal when it was installed, because of the flamboyant pose of the nude figures.

A young new sculptor, Auguste Rodin, attempted to break into the sculptural profession during the Second Empire, with no success;  he applied three times to the École des Beaux-Arts, but was rejected each time.

Music

The operetta
Under Napoleon III, a new, lighter musical genre, the operetta, was born in Paris, and flourished especially in the work of Jacques Offenbach.  It emerged not from the classical opera, but from the comic opera and vaudeville, which were very popular at the time.  Its characteristics were a light subject, an abundance of amusement and comedy, spoken dialogue mixed with songs and instrumental music.  The first works were staged in 1848 by August Florimond Ronger, better known as Hervé.

The works of Hervé included  Latrouillatt and Truffaldini, or the inconveniences of a vendetta infinitely prolonged too long and Agamemnon, or the Camel with Two Humps. The early works were limited to two performers on the stage at a time, and usually were no longer than a single act.  After 1858, they became longer and more elaborate, with larger casts and several acts, and took the name first of operas bouffes,  then operettas.  Hervé opened his own theater, the Folies Concertantes on the Boulevard du Temple, the main theater district of Paris, and they were also staged at other theatres around the city.

A new composer, Jacques Offenbach, soon emerged to challenge Hervé.  Born in Germany, Offenbach was first a cello player with the orchestra of the Opéra-Comique, then the conductor of the orchestra for the Comédie-Française, composing music performed between the acts. In 1853, he wrote a short musical scene performed between acts, then a more ambitious short comedy, Pepito, for the Théâtre des Variétés.  He was unable to have his work performed in the major theaters, so he tried a different approach.  In 1855, taking advantage of the first Paris International Exposition, which brought enormous crowds to the city, he rented a theater on the Champs-Élysées and put on his musicals to full houses.

He then opened up a new theater, the Bouffes-Parisiens, which opened in 1855 with a work called  Ba-ta-clan, a Chinese-style Musical.  Offenbach's theater attracted not only the working and middle class audiences, the traditional audience of the music halls,  but also the upper classes. The comic opera scenes alternated with musical interludes by Rossini, Mozart, and Pergolese. In 1858 he took a step further with his first full-length operetta, with four acts and a chorus,  Orpheus in the Underworld. It was a popular and critical triumph, playing for two hundred twenty-eight nights.  After the final night, Napoleon III granted Offenbach French citizenship, and his name changed formally from Jacob to Jacques.

Verdi and Wagner
Grand opera and other musical genres also flourished under Napoleon III.  The construction of the railroad stations in Paris brought thousands of tourists from around France and Europe to the city, and increased the demand for music and entertainment. Operas and musicals could play to larger houses, and play for much longer.  The old theaters on the "Boulevard of Crime" were demolished to make way for a new boulevard, but larger new theaters were constructed in the center of the city. Verdi signed a contract in 1852 to create a new work for the Paris Opera, in collaboration with Eugène Scribe.  The result was Les vêpres siciliennes. Verdi complained that the Paris orchestra and chorus were unruly and undisciplined, and rehearsed them an unheard-of one hundred and sixty-one times before he felt they were ready.

His work was rewarded. The opera was a critical and popular success, performed 150 times, rather than the originally proposed forty performances. He was unhappy, however, that his operas were less successful in Paris than those of his chief rival, Meyerbeer; he returned to Italy and did not come back for several years. He was persuaded to return to stage Don Carlos, commissioned especially for the Paris Opera. Once again he ran into troubles;  one singer took him to court over the casting, and rivalries between other singers poisoned the production. He wrote afterwards, "I am not a composer for Paris I believe in inspiration; others only care about how the pieces are put together".

Napoleon III intervened personally to have Richard Wagner come back to Paris; Wagner rehearsed the orchestra sixty-three times for the first French production of  Tannhäuser on March 13, 1861. Unfortunately, Wagner was unpopular with both the French critics and with the members of the Jockey Club, an influential French social society. During the premiere, with Wagner in the audience, the Jockey Club members whistled and jeered from the first notes of the Overture. After just three performances, the Opera was pulled from the repertoire. Wagner got his revenge in 1870, when the Prussian Army captured Napoleon III and surrounded Paris; he wrote a special piece of music to celebrate the event, "Ode to the German Army at Paris".

During the Second Empire, before the contraction of the Opéra Garnier, Paris had three major opera houses: The Salle Le Pelletier, where the Emperor barely escaped a terrorist bomb in 1858; the Théâtre Lyrique; and Les Italiens, where only Italian works were presented, in Italian. The major French composers of the period included Charles Gounod, Hector Berlioz, and Félicien David, and Gabriel Fauré.

The new French opera: Gounod and Bizet
While Verdi and Wagner certainly attracted the most attention, young new French composers were also striving to win attention. Charles Gounod wrote his first opera, Sapho, in 1851 at the urging of his friend, the singer Pauline Viardot; it was a commercial failure. He had no great theatrical success until Faust, derived from Goethe, which premiered at the Théâtre Lyrique in 1859. This remains the composition for which he is best known; and although it took a while to achieve popularity, it became one of the most frequently staged operas of all time, with no fewer than 2,000 performances of the work having occurred by 1975 at the Paris Opéra alone.

Georges Bizet wrote his first opera, Les pêcheurs de perles, for the Théâtre Lyrique company. It had its first performance on 30 September 1863.  Critical opinion was generally hostile, though Berlioz praised the work, writing that it "does M. Bizet the greatest honour". Public reaction was lukewarm, and the opera's run ended after 18 performances. It was not performed again until 1886.  Bizet did not have a major success until Carmen in 1875.  He died after the thirty-third performance. Carmen went on to become one of the most performed operas of all time.

Popular music
The styles of popular music also evolved under Napoleon III. The café-concert or café-concert was a Paris institution, with at least one in every neighborhood. They ranged from a single singer with a piano to elegant cafes with orchestras. A city ordinance, designed to protect the traditional musical theaters, forbid the performers in cafés from wearing costumes, dancing, or pantomime, or the use of sets or scenery; they were also forbidden to sing more than forty songs in an evening, and had to present the program in advance each day. This law was challenged by one café-concert owner, who hired a former actress from the Comédie-Française to perform scenes of classic plays in costume. The law was revised in 1867, which opened the way to an entirely new institution in Paris, the music hall, with comedy, sets, and costumed singers and dancers. For the first time, the profession of singer was given formal status, and for the first time composers could seek royalties for the performance of their songs.

See also

Paris during the Second Empire
Beaux-Arts architecture

References

"Second Empire style" (2008). In Encyclopædia Britannica. Retrieved 1 June 2008, from Encyclopædia Britannica Online

Bibliography

External links

Architectural styles
Revival architectural styles
Architecture in France
French architectural styles
 01
Architecture
House styles
Modern history of France
Neoclassical movements
Victorian architectural styles